The Helicopter Spies is a 1968 feature-length film version of The Man from U.N.C.L.E.s fourth season two-part episode "The Prince of Darkness Affair".  The episodes were originally broadcast in the United States on October 2, 1967, and October 9, 1967, on NBC.  Like the television series, it stars Robert Vaughn and David McCallum.  It is the seventh such feature film that used as its basis a reedited version of one or more episodes from the series. The film was directed by Boris Sagal and written by Dean Hargrove. Carol Lynley, Bradford Dillman, Lola Albright, John Dehner, Julie London, H.M. Wynant, and Roy Jenson also star in the film.

Production
The first four U.N.C.L.E. feature films made significant changes and additions to the episodes from which they were drawn.  This movie, like the two immediately before it (“The Spy in the Green Hat” and “The Karate Killers”), makes relatively minimal changes to the episodes.  No major scenes were added or removed, and very few trims were made to fit the episodes into the running time of the film.  As with the prior movies, though, musical cues and accompanying music was sometimes changed.  Also changed were two short scenes that became slightly more risqué than generally shown on American network television at the time (in both movie scenes a shirtless man is in Laurie Sebastian’s bed; in the TV version she is alone).  Other minor changes included:  a few changed camera angles, some enhanced higher-quality stock footage scenes of a rocket launch at the end, a little more physical contact between Sebastian and a female assistant, an insert of a swinging ax, and a very short scene missing from the television episode showing Solo slipping loose ropes that were binding him while escaping from a boat.  When compared to the prior six films, though, this came the closest to simply showing the TV episode intact.

Synopsis
U.N.C.L.E. agents Napoleon Solo, (Robert Vaughn) and Illya Kuryakin (David McCallum) witness the aerial destruction wrought on an African village by Dr. Kharmusi using his newly developed “thermal prism”.  U.N.C.L.E. then seeks out notorious safe cracker (and former thermal prism researcher himself) Luther Sebastian to help them obtain the device from Dr. Kharmusi.  Sebastian is on an island among a religious group called “The Third Way”, a mystical organization with disciples having – except for Sebastian – platinum white hair and all having a belief that when the “Old Man” in their group finally speaks after twenty years of silence The Third Way will have dominion over the world.  Wanted in nearly two dozen countries Sebastian agrees to leave the island and help U.N.C.L.E. in return for world-wide immunity from prosecution.

Solo makes his way to Dr. Kharmusi’s fortress but is initially delayed by Annie and her friend Aksoy.  She feels that Sebastian can help free her fiancé and Aksoy’s brother, both of whom were unjustly imprisoned because of Sebastian.  However, Dr. Kharmusi’s wife Azalea betrays her husband, kills Aksoy, abandons Annie, and helps Solo get into the fortress.  Unfortunately for Solo, Annie follows him and, claiming to be his wife, gains access herself.

Despite the setback Solo locates the safe and informs Kuryakin and Sebastian (who separately made their way to the roof).  Sebastian steals the prism - from a safe he himself designed - while Solo and Azalea are caught and tortured in a room slowly filling with sand.  Kuryakin rescues them, but a brief fight results in Kharmusi’s death.  His death automatically triggers a self-destruct device in his fortress, so the U.N.C.L.E. group flees the area immediately with the prism.

Safely outside the blast radius, Sebastian reveals that he and Azalea (a priestess of The Third Way) have been working together and the entire course of events has been his plan.  They felt they could only steal the device with U.N.C.L.E.’s help and explain that by launching the thermal prism into orbit they can get countries to pay protection money of any amount.  Sebastian then traps Solo, Kuryakin, and Annie on a boat placed on a collision course with the extraction ship.  Escaping moments before the craft is destroyed by a defensively fired torpedo, the group is picked up and taken back to U.N.C.L.E. HQ in New York.

Regrouping, Solo leaves to speak to Sebastian’s wife in Los Angeles.  She denies knowing where Sebastian is, but as soon as Solo leaves she phones Sebastian at his launch facility.  Sebastian orders Solo killed, but Solo instead kills his white-haired attackers.  He adopts white coloring in his hair, takes the place of one of the men he killed, and reports in with other similar men for a briefing where Sebastian says their mission is to steal a U.S. rocket.  Solo thereafter distinguishes himself by helping the group steal the rocket from a train.

Kuryakin meanwhile follows up on a lead from Solo and investigates a suspicious connection between Sebastian and an abandoned theater in Los Angeles.  Followed by Annie and an identical brother of Askoy, Kuryakin discovers that the theater is hosting a status briefing for followers of The Third Way.  They are then all captured, but Askoy’s brother is killed by an ejector seat along the highway.  Sebastian then remotely triggers a gas release that kills all the white-haired party goers except for Solo, who barely escapes and meets a third identical Askoy brother.

Solo returns to Sebastian’s wife and tricks her into contacting Sebastian.  Tracing the call, U.N.C.L.E. discovers the local building from which Sebastian’s launch facility is hidden.  Askoy’s third brother and Solo infiltrate the building.  After a battle in which the Askoy brother dies, Sebastian falls through an open hatch in the rocket and is launched along with it.  U.N.C.L.E. reinforcements arrive, the rocket self-destructs, and the “old man” dies without having spoken.  Back at U.N.C.L.E. HQ Annie discovers from a fourth identical Askoy brother that her fiancé, though released from prison thanks to U.N.C.L.E., had changed his mind about marriage.  Annie and Askoy’s fourth brother thereafter walk out arm in arm.

Cast

 Robert Vaughn – Napoleon Solo 
 David McCallum – Illya Kuryakin 
 Carol Lynley – Annie 
 Bradford Dillman – Luther Sebastian 
 Lola Albright – Azalea  
 Leo G. Carroll – Alexander Waverly
 John Dehner – Dr. Kharmusi 
 John Carradine – Third-Way Priest  
 Julie London – Laurie Sebastian 
 H.M. Wynant – The Aksoy Brothers 
 Roy Jenson – Carl 
 Kathleen Freeman – Mom 
 Barbara Moore – Lisa Rogers

Release
Like most of the later U.N.C.L.E. films, The Helicopter Spies was not released theatrically in the US, though it had a wide release internationally.  It premiered in London at the Ritz theater on February 22, 1968, a month after the final episode of the series aired in the U.S.

Home media
The film was released on DVD on November 2, 2011 by Warner Archive Collection.

See also
List of American films of 1968

References

Sources

External links
 
 Site with a detailed chronology of the production of the show and movie

1960s English-language films
American spy films
1968 films
1960s spy films
Metro-Goldwyn-Mayer films
Films directed by Boris Sagal
Films edited from television programs
The Man from U.N.C.L.E.
1960s American films